Jenny Kissed Me is a 1985 Australian drama film directed by Brian Trenchard-Smith. The director calls it a "tearjerker for men". It has no connection to the poem Jenny kiss'd Me by Leigh Hunt.

Plot
Jenny is the ten-year-old daughter of Carol, who lives with Lindsay. Carol has an affair and Jenny goes to live with Lindsay, who has a terminal disease.

Cast
 Ivar Kants as Lindsay West
 Deborra-Lee Furness as Carol West
 Tamsin West as Jennifer (Jenny) West
 Paula Duncan as Gaynor Roberts
 Steven Grives as Mal Evans
 Mary Ward as Grace

Production
The film was funded by the Nilsen group in Melbourne who had invested in BMX Bandits (1983). Trenchard-Smith said he identified with the "human tragedy" of the story where a man came home and lost his step daughter overnight.One important element in the film is commitment to family and children, as opposed to individual selfishness and the fear of loss of freedom. I was trying to show that the narcissism of the seventies can put a family into a private hell. The seventies had a trade-it-in, throw-it-away attitude towards relationships: if they don't work out, move on. Well, there's a price to pay for moving on when children are involved: you irrevocably damage their lives. And I'm suggesting that in Australia, where has been a 40% failure rate in marriages, there has been a fairly flippant attitude that hasn't really been thought through.

The original script was written by experienced TV writer Judith Colquhoun. Trenchard Smith wanted to "give the story more style" and "make the characters more sophisticated and the feeling more upmarket" but Colquhoun refused to make the changes so the director brought in Warwick Hinds to rewrite. He then cut six pages, rewrote some scenes and wrote two new scenes of his own. Shooting started on 11 March 1985.

Reception
The film was not widely seen, although it screened on Channel Seven. Trenchard Smith later said, "I am fond of the picture, a little florid and melodramatic perhaps, but I wanted to push the conventions of the "weepie."

References

External links
 
 Jenny Kissed Me at Oz Movies

Australian drama films
1986 films
Films directed by Brian Trenchard-Smith
1980s English-language films